Bill Evans at the Montreux Jazz Festival is a 1968 album by the American jazz pianist Bill Evans, recorded live at that year's Montreux Jazz Festival. The trio's performance on this album won them the 1969 Grammy for Best Jazz Instrumental Album, Individual or Group.

Reception

Writing for Allmusic, music critic Rovi Staff wrote the album "marks the beginning of stylistic changes for the legendary pianist. Only one year earlier, his At Town Hall release found his approach generally more introspective and brooding. In contrast, this set is more lively, playful, and experimental... He experiments more with harmonic dissonance and striking rhythmical contrasts, making this his most extroverted playing since his freshman release, New Jazz Conceptions."

Track listing
"Spoken Introduction" – 0:57
"One for Helen" (Bill Evans) – 4:22
"A Sleepin' Bee" (Harold Arlen, Truman Capote) – 6:05
"Mother of Earl" (Earl Zindars) – 5:14
"Nardis" (Miles Davis) – 8:23
"Quiet Now" (Denny Zeitlin) – 6:26
"I Loves You, Porgy" (George Gershwin, Ira Gershwin, DuBose Heyward) – 6:00
"The Touch of Your Lips" (Ray Noble) – 4:45
"Embraceable You" (George Gershwin, Ira Gershwin) – 6:45
"Some Day My Prince Will Come" (Frank Churchill, Larry Morey) – 6:08
"Walkin' Up" (Evans) – 3:34

Personnel 
 Bill Evans - piano
 Eddie Gómez - double bass
 Jack DeJohnette - drums

Legacy 
Nardis in Track 5 was sampled by MF DOOM in "Raid" from his album, Madvillainy.

Discography

References

External links
Jazz Discography Bill Evans Catalog
Bill Evans Memorial Library

Bill Evans live albums
Albums recorded at the Montreux Jazz Festival
1968 live albums
Verve Records live albums
Grammy Award for Best Jazz Instrumental Album